Marcel T. Renata (born 24 February 1994) is a New Zealand rugby union player who currently plays as a prop for  in New Zealand's domestic Mitre 10 Cup.

Senior career

Renata first made the Auckland provincial squad in 2015 and it was largely a year of learning for him as he made only 2 substitute appearances.   The following year he saw much more action, making 9 appearances, 6 of which were from the start in the number 3 jersey.

International

Whilst playing club rugby for the Varsity Vipers in Auckland, Renata was a late addition to the Māori All Blacks squad in 2015, making his debut off the bench against the New Zealand Barbarians side on the 18th of July. He was then selected by Head Coach Colin Cooper for the 2016 end of year tour, on which he played in all three matches.

References

1994 births
New Zealand rugby union players
New Zealand Māori rugby union players
Rugby union props
Auckland rugby union players
Hurricanes (rugby union) players
Blues (Super Rugby) players
Māori All Blacks players
Rugby union players from Auckland
Ngāti Whanaunga people
Te Aupōuri people
Living people